The Racial Contract is a book by the Jamaican-American philosopher Charles W. Mills in which he shows that, although it is conventional to represent the social contract moral and political theories of Thomas Hobbes, John Locke, Jean-Jacques Rousseau, and Immanuel Kant as neutral with respect to race and ethnicity, in actuality, the philosophers understood them to regulate only relations between whites; in relation to non-whites, these philosophers helped to create a "racial contract", which in both formal and informal ways permitted whites to oppress and exploit non-whites and validate their own moral ideals in dealing with non-whites. Because in contemporary political philosophy, white philosophers take their own white privilege for granted, they don't recognize that white supremacy is a political system, and so in their developments of ideal, moral and political theory never consider actual practice. Mills proposes to develop a non-ideal theory "to explain and expose the inequities of the actual nonideal policy and to help us see through the theories and moral justifications offered in defense of them." Using it as a central concept, "the notion of a Racial Contract might be more revealing of the real character of the world we are living in, and the corresponding historical deficiencies of its normative theories and practices, than the raceless notions currently dominant in political theory." The book has been translated into various languages.

Synopsis
Mills argues that racism is at the core of the "social contract", rather than racism being an unintended result attributed to the killings, raping of White Men. Specifically, the racial contract is a tacit (and at times explicit) agreement among members of the tribes of Europe to assert, promote, and maintain the ideal of white supremacy as against all other tribes of the world. This intention is deliberate and an integral characteristic of the social contract, a characteristic which persists to the present day. In Mills' words, "...what has usually been taken...as the racist 'exception' has really been the rule; what has been taken as the 'rule'...[racial equality]...has really been the exception."

Mills argues however, that these ideals of the social contract are at worst pure fiction or at best were intended only to apply to a specific group of people, namely members of the tribes of Europe and their genetic descendants. "...when white people say 'Justice,' they mean 'Just Us'."

 See also 

 The Sexual Contract''

References

Further reading 

 
 
 Marwah, Inder S. (2022), Levy, Jacob T. (ed.), "Charles W. Mills, The Racial Contract", The Oxford Handbook of Classics in Contemporary Political Theory, Oxford University Press
 
 
 
 

1997 non-fiction books
Books in political philosophy
Cornell University Press books
Non-fiction books about racism
White supremacy